Legislative elections were held in Vietnam on 23 May 2021 to elect members of the National Assembly, which would subsequently appoint the Prime Minister, and deputies of People's Councils. The election took place on a Sunday in line with local legislation. Results were announced on 10 June.

Background
The Communist Party of Vietnam rules Vietnam as a one-party state and as such is the only party that can contest the elections. In the 2016 elections the party won 475 of the 496 seats, with the rest going to independent members of the government-aligned Vietnamese Fatherland Front.

Electoral system
The members of the National Assembly will be elected from 184 multi-member constituencies using the two-round system, with a maximum number of 500 candidates to be elected. Block voting is used, with each district having two or three seats. Candidates have to receive at least 50% of the vote in the first round to be elected, with a second round held on a plurality basis.

Results
One seat in Bình Dương Province was left vacant after the National Election Council did not confirm the winning candidate was eligible to enter parliament.

References

Elections in Vietnam
Vietnam
Legislative
Election and referendum articles with incomplete results
Legislative